This is a list of mayors of Yverdon-les-Bains, Vaud, Switzerland. The mayor (syndic) of Yverdon-les-Bains chairs the seven-member municipal council (Municipalité).

References 

Yverdon-les-Bains
Yverdon
 
Lists of mayors (complete 1900-2013)